The NCAA Division I men's basketball tournament, branded as NCAA March Madness and commonly called March Madness, is a single-elimination tournament played each spring in the United States, currently featuring 68 college basketball teams from the Division I level of the National Collegiate Athletic Association (NCAA), to determine the national champion. The tournament was created in 1939 by the National Association of Basketball Coaches, and was the idea of Ohio State coach Harold Olsen. Played mostly during March, it has become one of the most popular annual sporting events in the United States.

It has become extremely common in popular culture to predict the outcomes of each game, even among non-sports fans; it is estimated that tens of millions of Americans participate in a bracket pool contest every year. Mainstream media outlets such as ESPN, CBS Sports and Fox Sports host tournaments online where contestants can enter for free.  Employers have also noticed a change in the behavior of employees during this time: they have seen an increase in the number of sick days used, extended lunch breaks and even the rescheduling of conference calls to allow for more tournament watching. Many handicappers and pundits also offer advice for winning their own bracket.

The tournament teams include champions from 32 Division I conferences (which receive automatic bids), and 36 teams which are awarded at-large berths. These "at-large" teams are chosen by an NCAA selection committee, then announced in a nationally televised event dubbed Selection Sunday. The 68 teams are divided into four regions and organized into a single-elimination "bracket", which pre-determines – when a team wins a game – which team it will face next. Each team is "seeded", or ranked, within its region from 1 to 16. After the First Four round, the remainder of the tournament begins the third Thursday of March, and is played over the course of three weekends, at pre-selected neutral sites across the United States. Teams, seeded by rank, proceed through a single-game elimination bracket beginning with the First Four round, a first round consisting of 64 teams playing in 32 games over the course of two days, the second round consisting of the 32 remaining teams playing in 16 games that weekend, the "Sweet Sixteen" and "Elite Eight" rounds the next week and weekend, respectively, and – for the last weekend of the tournament – the "Final Four" round. The two Final Four games are played the Saturday preceding the first Sunday in April, with the championship game on Monday. These four teams, one from each region (East, South, Midwest, and West), compete in a preselected location for the national championship.

The tournament has been at least partially televised on network television since 1969. Currently, the games are broadcast by CBS, TBS, TNT, and truTV under the trade name NCAA March Madness. These networks paid the NCAA to broadcast the games in 2011. The contract was for 14 years and they paid $10.8 billion. However, in 2018 that contract was extended for another seven years making it valid through the year 2032. The average payment over the years comes out to be $891 million annually.
Since 2011, all games are available for viewing nationwide and internationally. As television coverage has grown, so too has the tournament's popularity. Currently, millions of Americans fill out a bracket, attempting to correctly predict the outcome of 63 games of the tournament (not including the First Four games).

With 11 national titles, UCLA has the record for the most NCAA Men's Division I Basketball Championships; John Wooden coached UCLA to 10 of its 11 titles. The University of Kentucky (UK) is second, with eight national titles. The University of North Carolina (UNC) is third, with six national titles, and Duke University and Indiana University are tied for fourth with five national titles. The University of Connecticut (UConn) and the University of Kansas (KU) are tied for sixth with four national titles. Villanova University is seventh with three national titles. The University of Cincinnati, the University of Florida, University of Louisville (who have a 3rd vacated title), Michigan State University, North Carolina State, Oklahoma State, and the University of San Francisco all have two national titles. 22 other teams have won a single national title. The tournament expanded to 64 teams in 1985, 65 in 2001, and 68 in 2011.

Both 2020 men's and women's tournaments were cancelled due to the COVID-19 pandemic. The 2021 tournament was subsequently played at various venues in Indiana, the first (and only) time that a tournament has been hosted in its entirety by one state.

Tournament format

The tournament consists of 68 teams competing in seven rounds of a single-elimination bracket. Thirty-two teams automatically qualify for the tournament by winning their conference tournament, played during the two weeks before the tournament, and thirty-six teams qualify by receiving an at-large bid based on their performance during the season. The Selection Committee determines the at-large bids, ranks all the teams 1 to 68, and places the teams in the bracket, all of which is revealed publicly on the Sunday before the tournament, dubbed Selection Sunday by the media and fans. There is no reseeding during the tournament and matchups in each subsequent round are predetermined by the bracket.

The tournament is divided into four regions, with each region having sixteen to eighteen teams. Regions are named after broad geographic regions of the United States, which vary from year to year. 

The tournament is played over three weekends, with two rounds occurring each weekend. Before the first weekend, eight teams compete in the First Four to advance to the First Round. Two games pair the lowest-ranked conference champions and two games pair the lowest-ranked at-large qualifiers. The First and Second Rounds are played during the first weekend, the Regional Semifinals and Regional Finals during the second weekend, and the National Semifinals and Championship Game during the third weekend. Regional rounds are branded as the Sweet Sixteen and Elite Eight and the third weekend is branded as the Final Four, all named after the number of teams remaining at the beginning of the round. All games, including the First Four, are scheduled so that teams will have one rest day between each game. This format has been in use since 2011, with minor changes to the schedule in 2021 due to the COVID-19 pandemic.

Seeding and Bracket 

The Selection Committee, which includes conference commissioners and university athletic directors appointed by the NCAA, determines the bracket during the week before the tournament. Since the results of several conference tournaments occurring during the same week can significantly impact the bracket, the Committee often makes several brackets for different results.

To make the bracket, the Committee ranks the whole field from 1 to 68; these are referred to as the true seed. The committee then divides the teams amongst the four regions, giving each a seed between No. 1 and No. 16. The same four seeds in all the regions are referred to as the seed line (i.e. the No. 6 seed line). Eight teams are doubled up and compete in the First Four. Two of the paired teams compete for No. 16 seeds, and the other two paired teams are the last at-large teams awarded bids to the tournament and compete for a seed line in the No. 11 to No. 14 range, which varies year to year based on the true seeds of the teams overall.

Teams are placed in the closest geographical region to reduce travel time. However, teams are moved to other regions to follow several rules for ensuring competitive balance and avoiding rematches from the regular season in early rounds.

The top four overall seeds are placed as No. 1 seeds in each region. The regions are paired so that if all the No. 1 seeds reached the Final Four true seed No. 1 would play No. 4 and No. 2 would play No. 3. The No. 2 teams are preferably placed so that the No. 5 true seed will not be paired with the No. 1 true seed. The committee ensures competitive balance among the top four seeds in each region by adding the true seed values up and comparing the values among the regions. If there is significant deviation, some teams will be moved among the regions to balance the true seed distribution.

If a conference has two to four teams in the top four seeds, they will be placed in different regions. Otherwise, teams from the same conference are placed to avoid a rematch before the regional finals if they have played three or more times in the season, the regional semifinals if they have played twice, or the second round if they have played once. Additionally, the committee is advised to avoid rematches from the regular season and the previous years' tournament in the First Four. Finally, the committee will attempt to ensure that a team is not moved out of their preferred geographical region an inordinate number of times based on their placement in the previous two tournaments. To follow these rules and preferences, the committee may move a team off of their expected seed line. Thus, for example, the 40th overall ranked team, originally slated to be a No. 10 seed within a particular region, may instead be moved up to a No. 9 seed or moved down to a No. 11 seed.

Since 2012, the committee has released the No. 1 to 68 true seed list after announcing the bracket.

Bracket Preview 
Since 2017, the Selection Committee has released a list of the top 16 teams three weeks before Selection Sunday. This list does not guarantee any team a bid, as the Committee re-ranks all teams when starting the final selection process.

First Four At-Large Seeding by Year 

The seed line of the four at-large teams competing in the First Four has varied each year, depending on the overall ranking of the at-large teams in the field.

Venues 
In the men's tournament, all sites are nominally neutral; teams are prohibited from playing tournament games on their home courts during the first, second, and regional rounds. By current NCAA rules, any court on which a team hosts more than three regular-season games (not including preseason or conference tournament games) is considered a "home court". For the First Four and the Final Four, the home court prohibition does not apply because only one venue hosts these rounds. The First Four is regularly hosted by the Dayton Flyers; as such, the team competed on their home court in 2015. Because the Final Four is hosted at indoor football stadiums, it is unlikely that a team will ever play on their home court again. The last time this was possible 1996 when the Continental Airlines Arena, home court of Seton Hall, hosted.

For the First and Second Rounds, eight venues host games, four on each day of the round. Each venue hosts two sets of four teams, referred to as "pods." To limit travel, teams are placed in pods closer to their home unless seeding rules would prevent it. Because each pod includes a top 4 seed, the highest ranked teams normally get the closest sites.

The possible pods by seeding are:
Pod A: 1 v. 16 and 8 v. 9
Pod B: 2 v. 15 and 7 v. 10
Pod C: 3 v. 14 and 6 v. 11
Pod D: 4 v. 13 and 5 v. 12

Winners

Titles by year

Titles by school

The following is a list of all schools that have won at least one NCAA men's basketball tournament, along with the year(s) in which they won their championship(s).

Result by school and by year

Tournament history

Mid-major teams
Mid-major teams—which are defined as teams from the America East Conference (America East), ASUN Conference (ASUN), Atlantic 10 (A-10), Big Sky Conference (Big Sky), Big South Conference (Big South), Big West Conference (Big West), Colonial Athletic Association (CAA), Conference USA (C-USA), Horizon League (Horizon), Ivy League (Ivy), Metro Atlantic Athletic Conference (MAAC), Mid-American Conference (MAC), Mid-Eastern Athletic Conference (MEAC), Missouri Valley Conference (MVC), Mountain West Conference (MW), Northeast Conference (NEC), Ohio Valley Conference (OVC), Patriot League (Patriot), Southern Conference (SoCon), Southland Conference (Southland), Southwestern Athletic Conference (SWAC), Summit League (Summit), Sun Belt Conference (Sun Belt), West Coast Conference (WCC), and the Western Athletic Conference (WAC)—have experienced success in the tournament at various times.

However, during the tenure of UNLV's coach at the time, Jerry Tarkanian, the Runnin' Rebels were widely viewed as a major program despite their conference affiliation (a situation similar to that of Gonzaga since the first years of the 21st century). Additionally, the Big West received three bids in the 1990 tournament. However, Marquette was not considered a "mid-major" program at that time. The very term "mid-major" was not coined until 1977, and did not see wide use until the 1990s. More significantly, Marquette was one of several traditional basketball powers that were still NCAA Division I independents in the late 1970s. Also, Marquette has been a member of widely acknowledged "major" basketball conferences since 1991, and is currently in the undeniably major Big East Conference. However, the MVC was generally seen in that day as a major basketball conference.

Three of the four most recent Final Fours have involved a single "mid-major" team by the definition used here—the 2017, 2018, and 2021 tournaments, with Gonzaga appearing in both 2017 and 2021 and Loyola Chicago appearing in 2018 (although by 2017 Gonzaga, which has appeared in every NCAA tournament in the 21st century, was generally considered a major program despite its membership in the mid-major WCC).

Arguably the tournament with the most mid-major success was the 1970 tournament, which had 63% representation of mid-major teams in the Sweet 16 (10/16), 75% representation in the Elite 8 (6/8), 75% representation in the Final 4 (3/4), and 50% representation in the national championship game (1/2). Jacksonville lost to UCLA in the National Championship, with New Mexico State defeating St. Bonaventure for third place.

Below is a table that shows the performance of mid-major teams from the Sweet Sixteen round to the national championship game from 1939—the tournament's first year—to the present day.

Notes
 The first column is a list of every mid-major conference. For the conferences that have predecessor names, a footnote (below the table) lists those names and years. Opposite each conference's name are the schools that have appeared in the tournament from the Sweet Sixteen onwards when the school was a member of the conference or a predecessor conference.
 Some of the conferences that are now considered mid-majors were regarded as major conferences in the past. For example:
 The Missouri Valley Conference was considered a major basketball conference until many of its most prominent members left in the mid-1970s (before Indiana State's 1979 run to the title game).
 Conference USA was considered a major conference at its formation in 1995. It arguably became a mid-major in 2005, when several of its more prominent teams left for the Big East Conference, and unquestionably became a mid-major during the early-2010s realignment cycle.
 The WAC was considered a major conference until 1999, when 8 of its 16 members left to form the Mountain West Conference.
 The MW was considered a major basketball conference until 2011, when two of its most prominent basketball programs (BYU and Utah) left for other conferences (West Coast Conference and Pac-12, respectively).
 As alluded to above, certain programs that were members of "mid-major" conferences during deep tournament runs are nonetheless widely viewed as having been major programs at that time. The same applies to many programs that were independent before the 1980s. Examples include (but are not limited to) San Francisco in the 1950s, Marquette in the 1970s, UNLV in the last part of the 20th century, and Gonzaga since the mid-2010s.

Defunct conferences and independents
This table shows teams that saw success in the tournament from now-defunct conferences or were independents.

One conference listed here, the Southwest Conference, was universally considered a major conference throughout its history. Of its final eight members, five are now in conferences typically considered "major" in basketball—three in the Big 12, one in the SEC, and one in The American. Another member that left during the SWC's last decade is now in the SEC. The Metro Conference, which operated from 1975 to 1995, is not listed here because it was considered a major basketball conference throughout its history. Most notably, Louisville, which was a member for the league's entire existence, won both of its NCAA-recognized titles (1980, 1986) while in the Metro. It was one of the two leagues that merged to form today's Conference USA. The other league involved in the merger, the Great Midwest Conference, was arguably a major conference; it was formed in 1990, with play starting in 1991, when several of the Metro's strongest basketball programs left that league.

Tournament appearances streaks
List of schools with the longest streaks of appearances in the NCAA tournament. Because no tournament was held in 2020, that year does not count as an interruption.
Bold Indicates an active current streak as of the 2023 tournament.

Tournament droughts
List of schools with the longest time between NCAA tournament appearances (minimum 20-year drought).
Bold Indicates an active current streak as of the 2023 tournament:

As of 2023, four schools that were considered "major college" by the Associated Press when it published its first college basketball rankings in 1948, and have been continuously in the AP's "major" classification, have yet to reach the national tournament. While the NCAA did not split into divisions until 1956 (university and college), the AP has distinguished "major colleges" from "small colleges" throughout the history of its basketball rankings.

Evolution of the tournament
The NCAA tournament has changed its format many times over the years, many of which are listed below.

Expansion of field
The NCAA tournament field has expanded a number of times throughout its history.
{| class=wikitable style="text-align:center"
!Years !! Teams !! Byes !! Play-ingames
|-
|1939–1950 || 8 || style="background:#DCDCDC;" rowspan=2| || style="background:#DCDCDC;" rowspan=7|
|-
|1951–1952 || 16 
|-
|1953–1968 || 22–25 || 7–10
|-
|1969–1974 || 25 || 7 
|-
|1975–1978 || 32 || 0 
|-
|1979 || 40 || 24
|-
|1980–1982 || 48 || 16 
|-
|1983   || 52  || 16 || 4 
|-
|1984  || 53 || 16 || 5 
|-
|1985–2000 || 64 || 0 || 0
|-
|2001–2010 || 65 || 0 || 1 
|-
|2011–|| 68 || 0 || 4 
|}
After the conclusion of the 2010 tournament, there was speculation about increasing the tournament size to as many as 128 teams. On April 1, the NCAA announced that it was looking at expanding to 96 teams for 2011. On April 22, the NCAA announced a new television contract with CBS/Turner that expanded the field to 68 teams.

From 2011 to 2015, the round of 64 was deemed to be the second round; beginning in 2016, the round of 64 was again deemed to be the first round.

Seeding history and statistics
The process of seeding was first used in 1978 for automatically qualified (Q) and at-large (L) teams respectively, and then for all teams within their respective region in 1979. Starting in 2004, the NCAA began releasing full seeding numbers making known the overall #1 seed.

No. 1 seeds by year and region
When seeding, the NCAA has used the following names for the four regions with the exception of 2004 to 2006 when they were named after host cities:
 East
 West
 Midwest ("Southwest" in 2011)
 South (1998–2010 and 2012–present, "Mideast" 1957–1984, "Southeast" 1985–1999 and 2011)
* Vacated.Bold denotes team also won tournament.† Overall #1 Seed (this distinction started being made in 2004).To date, only Kentucky and Virginia have had a #1 seed in each of the four regions

Number of #1 seeds by school

Last updated through 2023 tournament.* Vacated appearances excluded (see #1 seeds by year and region).

Venues
For a list of all the cities and arenas that have hosted the Final Four, go to Host cities, below.

Municipal Auditorium in Kansas City, Missouri, hosted the Final Four nine times, followed by the third Madison Square Garden in New York City, which hosted seven times, and Louisville's Freedom Hall, which hosted six times. Additionally, Indianapolis has hosted the Final Four seven times, across three venues.

Stadium size and domes
From 1997 to 2013, the NCAA required that all Final Four sessions take place in domed stadiums with a minimum capacity of 40,000, usually having only half of the dome in use. The Metrodome in Minneapolis, which usually hosted baseball and football, had one of the long ends of the court along the first baseline with temporary stands surrounding the court so that much of the outfield is isolated from the action. The same was true of football stadiums like the Alamodome in San Antonio and the RCA Dome in Indianapolis. The last NBA arena to host the Final Four was the Meadowlands Arena, then known as Continental Airlines Arena, in 1996. As of 2009, the minimum was increased to 70,000, by adding additional seating on the floor of the dome, and raising the court on a platform three feet above the dome's floor, which is usually crowned for football, like the setup at Ford Field in Detroit which hosted the 2009 Final Four.

In September 2012, the NCAA began preliminary discussions on the possibility of returning occasional Final Fours to basketball-specific arenas in major metropolitan areas. According to ESPN.com writer Andy Katz, when Mark Lewis was hired as NCAA executive vice president for championships during 2012, "he took out a United States map and saw that both coasts are largely left off from hosting the Final Four." Lewis added in an interview with Katz,
I don't know where this will lead, if anywhere, but the right thing is to sit down and have these conversations and see if we want our championship in more than eight cities or do we like playing exclusively in domes. None of the cities where we play our championship is named New York, Boston, Los Angeles, Chicago or Miami. We don't play on a campus. We play in professional football arenas.

Under then-current criteria, only eleven stadiums, all but two of which are current NFL venues, could be considered as Final Four locations:
 AT&T Stadium, Arlington (opened in 2009)
 AT&T Stadium, originally known as Cowboys Stadium, holds the world record basketball attendance when 108,713 attended the 2010 NBA All-Star Game.
 Allegiant Stadium, Las Vegas (opened in 2020)
 The Dome at America's Center, St. Louis (opened in 1995)
 Ford Field, Detroit (opened in 2002)
 Lucas Oil Stadium, Indianapolis (opened in 2008)
 Mercedes-Benz Stadium, Atlanta (opened in 2017)
 replaced the Georgia Dome, operational August 1992 to March 2017
 Caesars Superdome, New Orleans (opened in 1975)
 NRG Stadium, Houston (opened in 2002)
 State Farm Stadium, Glendale (opened in 2007)
 SoFi Stadium, Inglewood (opened in 2020)
 U.S. Bank Stadium, Minneapolis (opened in 2016)
 replaced the Hubert H. Humphrey Metrodome, operational April 1982 to January 2014
 Alamodome, San Antonio (opened in 1993)

Two domed stadiums that have hosted past Final Fours—the Alamodome (1998, 2004, 2008, 2018) and Tropicana Field in St. Petersburg, Florida (1999)—were considered too small to be eligible to host, despite the Alamodome being a college football stadium and having a permanent seating capacity of 65,000. The basketball setup at the Alamodome prior to 2018 used only half of the stadium and had a capacity of 39,500. This was changed for the 2018 Final Four to place a raised court at the center of the stadium as has been done with other football facilities.

The first instance of a domed stadium being used for an NCAA Tournament Final Four was the Houston Astrodome in 1971, but the Final Four would not return to a dome until 1982 when the Louisiana Superdome in New Orleans hosted the event for the first time.

On June 12, 2013, Katz reported that the NCAA had changed its policy. In July 2013, the NCAA had a portal available on its website for venues to make Final Four proposals in the 2017–2020 period, and there were no restrictions on proposals based on venue size. Also, the NCAA decided that future regionals will no longer be held in domes. In Katz' report, Lewis indicated that the use of domes for regionals was intended as a dry run for future Final Four venues, but this particular policy was no longer necessary because all of the Final Four sites from 2014 to 2016 had already hosted regionals. At least one other report indicated that the new policy would still allow a completely new domed stadium, or an existing dome that has never hosted a Final Four (such as State Farm Stadium), to receive a regional if it is awarded a future Final Four. In November 2014, reflecting the new policy's effect, the NCAA announced that what is now State Farm Stadium would host the Final Four in 2017.

Other changes

Bids per conferences
Prior to 1975, only one team per conference could be in the NCAA tournament. However, after several highly ranked teams in the country were denied entrance into the tournament (e.g., South Carolina, which was 14–0 in ACC regular season play during 1970 but lost in the ACC tournament; Southern Cal, which was ranked #2 in the nation during 1971; and Maryland, which was ranked #3 in the nation in 1974 but lost the ACC tournament championship game to eventual national champion North Carolina State), the NCAA began to place at-large teams in the tournament, instead of just conference champions. At times during the pre-at-large era, the National Invitational Tournament (NIT) competed for prestige with the NCAA tournament. However, in the 1950s the NCAA ruled that no team could compete in both tournaments. But when eighth ranked Marquette declined its invitation in 1970 after coach Al McGuire complained about the Warriors' regional placement and instead went to the NIT (which it won), the NCAA changed the rule to forbid a team that declines an NCAA Tournament bid from participating in any post-season tournament. Since then, the NCAA tournament has clearly been the major one, with conference champions and the majority of the top-ranked teams participating in it.

Consolation games
A third-place game was held from 1946 to 1981. Additionally, when the tournament was first held in 1939 with only two regionals (East and West), the West held a third-place game, but the East did not. The East began holding its own third-place game in 1941, and from then on every regional held a third-place game through the 1975 tournament.

Play-in games

Beginning in 2001, the field was expanded from 64 to 65 teams, adding to the tournament what was informally known as the "play-in game." This was in response to the creation of the Mountain West Conference during 1999. Originally, the winner of the Mountain West's tournament did not receive an automatic bid, and doing so would mean the elimination of one of the at-large bids. As an alternative to eliminating an at-large bid, the NCAA expanded the tournament to 65 teams. The #64 and #65 seeds were seeded in a regional bracket as the 16a/16b seeds, and then played the NCAA Division I Men's Basketball Opening Round Game (the "play-in game") on the Tuesday preceding the first weekend of the tournament. This game was always played at the University of Dayton Arena in Dayton, Ohio.

During 2011, the tournament expanded to 68 teams. Four "play-in" games are now played, officially known as the First Four". However, the teams playing in the First Four are not automatically seeded #16; their seeding is determined by the committee on Selection Sunday. Explaining the reasoning for this format, selection committee chairman Dan Guerrero said, "We felt if we were going to expand the field it would create better drama for the tournament if the First Four was much more exciting. They could all be on the 10 line or the 12 line or the 11 line."

Play-in round naming
From 1985 to 2010, the round consisting of 64 teams and 32 games was called the "first round", while the round consisting of 32 teams and 16 games was called the "second round". From 2011 to 2015, the First Four became the first round. The round after the First Four, the round of 64 played on Thursday and Friday, was called the "second round"; the round of 32 was then called the "third round", consisting of games played on Saturday and Sunday. In 2016, the naming reverted to the round of 64 being the "first round" once again, and the round of 32 being the "second round".

Pod system
For the 1985 to 2001 tournaments, all teams playing at a first- or second-round site fed into the same regional site.

National semifinal seeding 
Since 2004, the semi-final matches during the first day of the Final Four weekend have been determined by a procedure based upon the original seeding of the full field. From 1973 through 2003, the pitting of regional champions in the semi-finals was on a rotational basis. Prior to 1973, one semifinal matched the champions of the eastern regions, and the other matched the champions of the western regions.

Regions 
From 1957 to 1984, the "Mideast", roughly corresponding to the Southeastern region of the United States, designation was used. From 1985 to 1997, the Mideast region was known as "Southeast" and again changed to "South" starting from 1998. The selected names roughly correspond to the location of the four cities hosting the regional finals. From 2004 to 2006, the regions were named after their host cities, e.g. the Phoenix Regional in 2004, the Chicago Regional in 2005, and the Minneapolis Regional in 2006, but reverted to the traditional geographic designations beginning in 2007. For example, during 2012, the regions were named South (Atlanta, Georgia), East (Boston, Massachusetts), Midwest (St. Louis, Missouri), and West (Phoenix, Arizona).

Other notes

Home court advantage
On several occasions NCAA tournament teams played their games in their home arena. In 1959, Louisville played at its regular home of Freedom Hall; however, the Cardinals lost to West Virginia in the semifinals. In 1984, Kentucky defeated Illinois, 54–51 in the Elite Eight on its home court of Rupp Arena.  Also in 1984, #6 seeded Memphis played the first 2 rounds on its home court, defeating Oral Roberts and Purdue. In 1985, Dayton played its first-round game against Villanova (it lost 51–49) on its home floor. In 1986 (beating Brown before losing to Navy) and '87 (beating Georgia Southern and Western Kentucky), Syracuse played the first 2 rounds of the NCAA tournament in the Carrier Dome. Also in 1986, LSU played in Baton Rouge on its home floor for the first 2 rounds despite being an 11th seed (beating Purdue and Memphis State). In 1987, Arizona lost to UTEP on its home floor in the first round. In 2015, Dayton played at its regular home of UD Arena, and the Flyers beat Boise State in the First Four.

Since the inception of the modern Final Four in 1952, only once has a team played a Final Four on its actual home court—Louisville in 1959. But through the 2015 tournament, three other teams have played the Final Four in their home cities, one other team has played in its metropolitan area, and six additional teams have played the Final Four in their home states through the 2015 tournament. Kentucky (1958 in Louisville), UCLA (1968 and 1972 in Los Angeles, 1975 in San Diego), and North Carolina State (1974 in Greensboro) won the national title; Louisville (1959 at its home arena, Freedom Hall); Purdue (1980 in Indianapolis) lost in the Final Four; and California (1960 in the San Francisco Bay Area), Duke (1994 in Charlotte), Michigan State (2009 in Detroit), and Butler (2010 in Indianapolis) lost in the final.

In 1960, Cal had nearly as large an edge as Louisville had the previous year, only having to cross the San Francisco Bay to play in the Final Four at the Cow Palace in Daly City; the Golden Bears lost in the championship game to Ohio State. UCLA had a similar advantage in 1968 and 1972 when it advanced to the Final Four at the Los Angeles Memorial Sports Arena, not many miles from the Bruins' homecourt of Pauley Pavilion (also UCLA's home arena before the latter venue opened in 1965, and again during the 2011–12 season while Pauley was closed for renovations); unlike Louisville and Cal, the Bruins won the national title on both occasions. Butler lost the 2010 title  from its Indianapolis campus.

Before the Final Four was established, the East and West regionals were held at separate sites, with the winners advancing to the title game. During that era, three New York City teams, all from Manhattan, played in the East Regional at Madison Square Garden—frequently used as a "big-game" venue by each team—and advanced at least to the national semifinals. NYU won the East Regional in 1945 but lost in the title game, also held at the Garden, to Oklahoma A&M. CCNY played in the East Regional in both 1947 and 1950; the Beavers lost in the 1947 East final to eventual champion Holy Cross but won the 1950 East Regional and national titles at the Garden.

In 1974, North Carolina State won the NCAA tournament without leaving its home state of North Carolina. The team was put in the East Region, and played its regional games at its home arena Reynolds Coliseum. NC State played the final four and national championship games at nearby Greensboro Coliseum.

While not its home state, Kansas has played in the championship game in Kansas City, Missouri, only 45 minutes from the campus in Lawrence, Kansas, on four different occasions. In 1940, 1953, and 1957 the Jayhawks lost the championship game each time at Municipal Auditorium. In 1988, playing at Kansas City's Kemper Arena, Kansas won the championship, over Big Eight–rival Oklahoma. Similarly, in 2005, Illinois played in St. Louis, Missouri, where it enjoyed a noticeable homecourt advantage, yet still lost in the championship game to North Carolina.

In 2002, Texas was paired with Mississippi State in Dallas despite being the lower seed. The #6 seeded Longhorns defeated the #3 seeded Bulldogs 68–64 in front of a predominately Texas crowd.

Flag controversy
The NCAA had banned the Bon Secours Wellness Arena, originally known as Bi-Lo Center, and Colonial Life Arena, originally Colonial Center, in South Carolina from hosting tournament games, despite their sizes (16,000 and 18,000 seats, respectively) because of an NAACP protest at the Bi-Lo Center during the 2002 first and second round tournament games over that state's refusal to completely remove the Confederate Battle Flag from the state capitol grounds, although it had already been relocated from atop the capitol dome to a less prominent place in 2000. Following requests by the NAACP and Black Coaches Association, the Bi-Lo Center, and the newly built Colonial Center, which was built for purposes of hosting the tournament, were banned from hosting any future tournament events. As a result of the removal of the battle flag from the South Carolina State Capitol, the NCAA lifted its ban on South Carolina hosting games in 2015, and it was able to host in 2017 due to House Bill 2 (see next section).

House Bill 2
On September 12, 2016, the NCAA stripped the State of North Carolina of hosting rights for seven upcoming college sports tournaments and championships held by the association, including early round games of the 2017 NCAA Division I men's basketball tournament scheduled for the Greensboro Coliseum. The NCAA argued that House Bill 2 made it "challenging to guarantee that host communities can help deliver [an inclusive atmosphere]". Bon Secours Wellness Arena was able to secure the bid to be the replacement site.

Rituals and influence

Cutting down the nets

As a tournament ritual, the winning team cuts down the nets at the end of regional championship games as well as the national championship game. Starting with the seniors, and moving down by classes, players each cut a single strand off each net; the head coach cuts the last strand connecting the net to the hoop, claiming the net itself. An exception to the head coach cutting the last strand came in 2013, when Louisville head coach Rick Pitino gave that honor to Kevin Ware, who had suffered a catastrophic leg injury during the tournament. This tradition is credited to Everett Case, the coach of North Carolina State, who stood on his players' shoulders to accomplish the feat after the Wolfpack won the Southern Conference tournament in 1947. CBS, since 1987 and yearly to 2015, in the odd-numbered years since 2017, and TBS, since 2016, the even-numbered years, close out the tournament with "One Shining Moment", performed by Luther Vandross.

Team awards
Just as the Olympics awards gold, silver, and bronze medals for first, second, and third place, respectively, the NCAA awards the National Champions a gold-plated Wooden NCAA national championship trophy. The loser of the championship game receives a silver-plated National Runner-Up trophy for second place. Since 2006, all four Final Four teams receive a bronze plated NCAA Regional Championship trophy; prior to 2006, only the teams who did not make the title game received bronze plated trophies for being a semifinalist.

The champions also receive a commemorative gold championship ring, and the other three Final Four teams receive Final Four rings.

The National Association of Basketball Coaches also presents a more elaborate marble/crystal trophy to the winning team. Ostensibly, this award is given for taking the top position in the NABC's end-of-season poll, but this is invariably the same as the NCAA championship game winner. In 2005, Siemens AG acquired naming rights to the NABC trophy, which is now called the Siemens Trophy. Formerly, the NABC trophy was presented right after the standard NCAA championship trophy, but this caused some confusion. Since 2006, the Siemens/NABC Trophy has been presented separately at a press conference the day after the game.

Most Outstanding Player
After the championship trophy is awarded, one player is selected and then awarded the Most Outstanding Player award (which almost always comes from the championship team). It is not intended to be the same as a Most Valuable Player award although it is sometimes informally referred to as such.

Influence on the NBA draft
Because the National Basketball Association Draft takes place just three months after the NCAA tournament, NBA executives have to decide how players' performances in a maximum of seven games, from the First Four to the championship game, should affect their draft decisions. A 2012 study for the National Bureau of Economic Research explores how the March tournament affects the way that professional teams behave in the June draft. The study is based on data from 1997 to 2010 that looks at how college tournament standouts performed at the NBA level.

The researchers determined that a player who outperforms his regular season averages or who is on a team that wins more games than its seed would indicate will be drafted higher than he otherwise would have been. At the same time, the study indicated that professional teams don't take college tournament performance into consideration as much as they should, as success in the tournament correlates with elite professional accomplishment, particularly top-level success, where a player makes the NBA All-Star Team three or more times. "If anything, NBA teams undervalue the signal provided by unexpected performance in the NCAA March Madness tournament as a predictor of future NBA success."

Television coverage and revenues

Current television contracts

Since 2011, the NCAA has had a joint contract with CBS and Turner Broadcasting. The coverage of the tournament is split between CBS, TNT, TBS, and truTV.

Broadcasters from CBS, TBS, and TNT's sports coverage are shared across all four networks, with CBS' college basketball teams supplemented with Turner's NBA teams, while studio segments take place at the CBS Broadcast Center in New York City and Turner's studios in Atlanta. In the New York-based studio shows, CBS' Greg Gumbel and Clark Kellogg are joined by Ernie Johnson, Jr., Kenny Smith, and Charles Barkley of TNT's Inside the NBA while Seth Davis of CBS assists with Casey Stern and various NBA TV personalities. While two of Turner's NBA voices, Kevin Harlan and Ian Eagle, are already employed by CBS in other capacities, they also lend analysts Reggie Miller, Chris Webber, Grant Hill, and Steve Smith and secondary play-by-play man Brian Anderson to CBS. In turn, CBS announcers Jim Nantz, Brad Nessler, Spero Dedes, Andrew Catalon, and Tom McCarthy appear on Turner network broadcasts along with analysts Jim Spanarkel, Bill Raftery, and Dan Bonner.

The most recent transaction in 2018 renews the contract through 2032 and, for the first time in history, provides for the nationwide broadcast each year of all games of the tournament. All First Four games air on truTV. A featured first- or second-round game in each time "window" is broadcast on CBS, while all other games are shown either on TBS, TNT or truTV. The regional semifinals, better known as the Sweet Sixteen, are split between CBS and TBS. CBS had the exclusive rights to the regional finals, also known as the Elite Eight, through 2014. That exclusivity extended to the entire Final Four as well, but after the 2013 tournament Turner Sports elected to exercise a contractual option for 2014 and 2015 giving TBS broadcast rights to the national semifinal matchups. CBS kept its national championship game rights.

Since 2015, CBS and TBS split coverage of the Elite Eight. Since 2016 CBS and TBS alternate coverage of the Final Four and national championship game, with TBS getting the final two rounds in even-numbered years, and CBS getting the games in odd-numbered years. March Madness On Demand would remain unchanged, although Turner was allowed to develop their own service.

The CBS broadcast provides the NCAA with over $500 million annually, and makes up over 90% of the NCAA's annual revenue. The revenues from the multibillion-dollar television contract are divided among the Division I basketball playing schools and conferences as follows:
1/6 of the money goes directly to the schools based on how many sports they play (one "share" for each sport starting with 14, which is the minimum needed for Division I membership).
1/3 of the money goes directly to the schools based on how many scholarships they give out (one share for each of the first 50, two for each of the next 50, ten for each of the next 50, and 20 for each scholarship above 150).
1/2 of the money goes to the conferences based on how well they did in the six previous men's basketball tournaments (counting each year separately, one share for each team getting in, and one share for each win except in the Final Four and, prior to the 2008 tournament, the Play-in game). In 2007, based on the 2001 through 2006 tournaments, the Big East received over $14.85 million, while the eight conferences that did not win a first-round game in those six years received slightly more than $1 million each. Most conferences distribute most of the revenue evenly to its member institutions, regardless of performance. By 2021, the value of the shares or "units" to a conference was worth US$337,141.

History of television coverage
CBS has been the major partner of the NCAA in televising the tournament since 1982, but there have been many changes in coverage since the tournament was first broadcast in 1969.

Early broadcast coverage
From 1969 to 1981, the NCAA tournament aired on NBC, but not all games were televised. The early rounds, in particular, were not always seen on TV.

In 1982, CBS obtained broadcast television rights to the NCAA tournament.

ESPN & CBS share coverage
In 1980, ESPN began showing the opening rounds of the tournament. This was the network's first contract signed with the NCAA for a major sport, and helped to establish ESPN's following among college basketball fans. ESPN showed six first-round games on Thursday and again on Friday, with CBS, from 1982 to 1990, then picking up a seventh game at 11:30 pm ET. Thus, 14 of 32 first-round games were televised. ESPN also re-ran games overnight. At the time, there was only one ESPN network, with no ability to split its signal regionally, so ESPN showed only the most competitive games. During the 1980s, the tournament's popularity on television soared.

CBS takes over
However, ESPN became a victim of its own success, as CBS was awarded the rights to cover all games of the NCAA tournament, starting in 1991. Only with the introduction of the so-called "play-in" game (between the 64 seed and the 65 seed) in the 2000s, did ESPN get back in the game (and actually, the first time this "play-in" game was played in 2001, the game was aired on The National Network, using CBS graphics and announcers, as both CBS and TNN were both owned by Viacom at the time.

Through 2010, CBS broadcast the remaining 63 games of the NCAA tournament proper. Most areas saw only eight of 32 first-round games, seven of 16 second-round games, and four of eight regional semifinal games (out of the possible 56 games during these rounds; there would be some exceptions to this rule in the 2000s). Coverage preempted regular programming on the network, except during a 2-hour window from about 5 ET until 7 ET when the local affiliates could show programming. The CBS format resulted in far fewer hours of first-round coverage than under the old ESPN format but allowed the games to reach a much larger audience than ESPN was able to reach.

During this period of near-exclusivity by CBS, the network provided to its local affiliates three types of feeds from each venue: constant feed, swing feed, and flex feed. Constant feeds remained primarily on a given game, and were used primarily by stations with a clear local interest in a particular game. Despite its name, a constant feed occasionally veered away to other games for brief updates (as is typical in most American sports coverage), but coverage generally remained with the initial game. A swing feed tended to stay on games believed to be of natural interest to the locality, such as teams from local conferences, but may leave that game to go to other games that during their progress become close matches. On a flex feed, coverage bounced around from one venue to another, depending on action at the various games in progress. If one game was a blowout, coverage could switch to a more competitive game. A flex feed was provided when there were no games with a significant natural local interest for the stations carrying them, which allowed the flex game to be the best game in progress. Station feeds were planned in advance and stations had the option of requesting either constant or flex feed for various games.

Viewing options emerge
In 1999, DirecTV began broadcasting all games otherwise not shown on local television with its Mega March Madness premium package. The DirecTV system used the subscriber's ZIP code to black out games which could be seen on broadcast television. Prior to that, all games were available on C-Band satellite and were picked up by sports bars.

In 2003, CBS struck a deal with Yahoo! to offer live streaming of the first three rounds of games under its Yahoo! Platinum service, for $16.95 a month. In 2004, CBS began selling viewers access to March Madness On Demand, which provided games not otherwise shown on broadcast television; the service was free for AOL subscribers. In 2006, March Madness On Demand was made free, and continued to be so to online users through the 2011 tournament. For 2012, it once again became a pay service, with a single payment of $3.99 providing access to all 67 tournament games. In 2013, the service, now renamed March Madness Live, was again made free, but uses Turner's rights and infrastructure for TV Everywhere, which requires sign-in though the password of a customer's cable or satellite provider to watch games, both via PC/Mac and mobile devices. Those that do not have a cable or satellite service or one not participating in Turner's TV Everywhere are restricted to games carried on the CBS national feed and three hours (originally four) of other games without sign-in, or coverage via Westwood One's radio coverage. Effective with the 2018 tournament, the national semifinals and final are under TV Everywhere restrictions if they are aired by Turner networks; before then, those particular games were not subject to said restrictions.

In addition, CBS Sports Network (formerly CBS College Sports Network) had broadcast two "late early" games that would not otherwise be broadcast nationally. These were the second games in the daytime session in the Pacific Time Zone, to avoid starting games before 10 AM. These games are also available via March Madness Live and on CBS affiliates in the market areas of the team playing. In other markets, newscasts, local programming or preempted CBS morning programming are aired. CBSSN is scheduled to continue broadcasting the official pregame and postgame shows and press conferences from the teams involved, along with overnight replays.

HDTV coverage
The Final Four has been broadcast in HDTV since 1999. From 2000 to 2004, only one first/second round site and one regional site were designated as HDTV sites. In 2005, all regional games were broadcast in HDTV, and four first and second round sites were designated for HDTV coverage. Local stations broadcasting in both digital and analog had the option of airing separate games on their HD and SD channels, to take advantage of the available high definition coverage. Beginning in 2007, all games in the tournament (including all first and second-round games) were available in high definition, and local stations were required to air the same game on both their analog and digital channels. However, due to satellite limitations, first round "constant" feeds were only available in standard definition. Moreover, some digital television stations, such as WRAL-TV in Raleigh, North Carolina, choose to not participate in HDTV broadcasts of the first and second rounds and the regional semifinals, and used their available bandwidth to split their signal into digital subchannels to show all games going on simultaneously. By 2008, upgrades at the CBS broadcast center allowed all feeds, flex and constant, to be in HD for the tournament.

International broadcasts

As of 2011, ESPN International holds international broadcast rights to the tournament, distributing coverage to its co-owned networks and other broadcasters. ESPN produces the world feed for broadcasts of the Final Four and championship game, produced using ESPN College Basketball staff and commentators.

Tournament statistics

Low seeded teams

Most successful low seeds
Best outcomes for low seeds since expansion to 64 teams in 1985:

Best performances by No. 16 seeds
In 2018, UMBC became the first No. 16 seed to defeat a No. 1 seed in the men's tournament, shocking Virginia 74–54. Before this breakthrough, five other 16 seeds lost by 4 or fewer points:

While ultimately Murray State lost to Michigan State by 4 points (75–71) in 1990, it was the only No. 16 team to take a game into overtime.
East Tennessee State lost to Oklahoma in 1989 (1 point, 72–71)
Princeton lost to Georgetown in 1989 (1 point, 50–49)
Western Carolina lost to Purdue in 1996 (2 points, 73–71)
Fairleigh Dickinson lost to Michigan in 1985 (4 points, 59–55)
In 2023, FDU became the second No. 16 seed to defeat a No. 1 seed in the tournament, beating Purdue 63-58.

Lowest-seeded pairings by round
The lowest-seeded combination in the national championship game is the 2014 pairing of No. 7 seed UConn and No. 8 seed Kentucky. UConn won, to become the second-lowest-seeded team to win the tournament.
The pairing of No. 8 seed Butler and No. 11 seed VCU in the 2011 National semifinals game was the lowest seeded combination to play in a National semifinals game.
The pairing of No. 8 seed North Carolina and No. 15 seed Saint Peter's in the 2022 East Regional Final was the lowest-seeded combination to play in a Regional Final.
The pairing of No. 10 seed Providence and No. 14 seed Chattanooga in the 1997 Southeast Regional semifinal was the lowest-seeded combination to play in a Regional semifinal.
There have been twenty-five Round of 32 matchups between two seeds who had won as the underdogs in the Round of 64: twelve 12-13 matchups, six 11-14 matchups, five 10-15 matchups, and two 9-16 matchups. The seeds add to 25 in each case, which is the lowest possible total for the second round.

Additional low-seed stats
 Villanova in 1985, a No. 8 seed, was the lowest seeded team to win the tournament.
Penn's 1979 Final Four appearance is also notable as they made it as a No. 9 seed—out of 10 teams in their region—making them the lowest seed to make the Final Four in the pre-64-team era.
Butler is the only team to make consecutive Final Fours (let alone Championship Games) while not being a No. 1 or No. 2 seed either time (No. 5 in 2010, No. 8 in 2011).
In 1989, the four 11-seeds swept the first round against their 6-seed opponents. As of 2022 this is the only time that 11-seeds have achieved this feat, and no lower seed ever has. Three out of four 12-seeds have advanced five times, in 2002, 2009, 2013, 2014, and 2019. The 10-seeds also swept the 7-seeds once, in 1999.
Richmond is the only team to win first-round games ranked as a No. 15, No. 14, No. 13, and No. 12 seed.
The most Round of 64 upsets over top-3 seeds occurring in a single tournament has been two, which has occurred ten times:
1986, 1995, 2015: Two No. 14 seeds over No. 3 seeds
1991, 1997, 2013, 2016, 2021: One No. 15 seed over a No. 2 seed and one No. 14 seed over a No. 3 seed
In 1991, 2013, 2016, and 2021, at least one team of every seed between No. 1 and No. 15 advanced to the round of 32.
2012: Two No. 15 seeds over No. 2 seeds
2023: One No. 16 seed over a No. 1 seed and one No. 15 seed over a No. 2 seed
2021 produced the highest total seed differential in an NCAA Tournament, with 128 across all the rounds of play. That is, the sum of seed differences among the 19 games won by lower-seeded teams was 128. This surpassed the previous mark of 111 in 2014, in which 22 games were won by lower seeded teams.
2013 was the only tournament to have three teams seeded No. 12 or lower in the Sweet Sixteen: No. 12 Oregon, No. 13 La Salle, and No. 15 Florida Gulf Coast.
 The 2018 South Region was the first region since seeding began in 1979 in which no top-4 seed advanced to the Sweet Sixteen (No. 5 Kentucky, No. 7 Nevada, No. 9 Kansas State, No. 11 Loyola–Chicago).
Georgetown is the only team to lose in five consecutive tournament appearances against a team seeded at least five spots lower:
 2008 (round of 32): No. 10 Davidson 74, No. 2 Georgetown 70.
 2010 (round of 64): No. 14 Ohio 97, No. 3 Georgetown 83.
 2011 (round of 64): No. 11 VCU 74, No. 6 Georgetown 56.
 2012 (round of 32): No. 11 NC State 66, No. 3 Georgetown 63.
 2013 (round of 64): No. 15 Florida Gulf Coast 78, No. 2 Georgetown 68.
 In 2021, Houston, a 2 seed, was the first team ever to reach the Final Four by defeating only double-digit seeds—in order, Cleveland State (15), Rutgers (10), Syracuse (11), and Oregon State (12).
 2021 featured 14 upsets, the most upsets in a single tournament. NCAA defines an upset as 5 seed lines or more between teams.

Notable point spread upsets
As noted above, despite numerous instances of early-round tournament upsets, only two No. 1 seeds have lost in the first round to a No. 16 seed. However, while seeding is one way of measuring the impact of an upset, prior to the implementation of seeding, point spread was the better determinant of an upset, and a loss by a highly favored team remains for many the definition of "upset". As the NCAA forbids any association with gambling, and point spreads vary depending on the bookie taking the bets, these are unofficial.

Biggest point-spread upsets since expansion to 64 teams in 1985:
Fairleigh Dickinson +23.5 over Purdue 63–58 in 2023
Norfolk State +21.5 over Missouri 86–84 in 2012
UMBC +20.5 over Virginia 74–54 in 2018
Santa Clara +20 over Arizona 64–61 in 1993.
Coppin State +18.5 over South Carolina 78–65 in 1997
Saint Peter's +18 over Kentucky 85–79 in 2022
Arkansas–Little Rock +17.5 over Notre Dame 90–83 in 1986
Hampton +17.5 over Iowa State 58–57 in 2001

Biggest point-spread upsets in NCAA Championship Game history:
Connecticut +9.5 over Duke, 77–74, in 1999
Villanova +9 over Georgetown, 66–64, in 1985
Kansas +8 over Oklahoma, 83–79, in 1988
North Carolina State +7.5 over Houston, 54–52 in 1983
Texas Western +6.5 over Kentucky, 72–65 in 1966

Highly seeded teams

All No. 1 seeds in the Final Four 

It has happened only once that all four No. 1 seeds made it to the Final Four:
2008 – Kansas (champion), North Carolina, UCLA, Memphis

Final Fours without a No. 1 seed 
Thrice (including twice since the field expanded to 64 teams) the Final Four has been without a No. 1 seed:
1980 – No. 2 Louisville (champion), No. 8 UCLA (runner-up), No. 5 Iowa, No. 6 Purdue
2006 – No. 3 Florida (champion), No. 2 UCLA (runner-up), No. 4 LSU, No. 11 George Mason
2011 – No. 3 Connecticut (champion), No. 8 Butler (runner-up), No. 4 Kentucky, No. 11 VCU

Since 1985, there have been 4 instances of three No. 1 seeds reaching the Final Four; 13 instances of two No. 1 seeds making it; and 14 instances of just one No. 1 seed reaching the Final Four.

No. 1 seeds in the Championship Game 
There have been nine occasions (eight times since the field expanded to 64) that the championship game has been played between two No. 1 seeds:
1982 – North Carolina beat Georgetown
1993 – North Carolina beat Michigan
1999 – Connecticut beat Duke
2005 – North Carolina beat Illinois
2007 – Florida beat Ohio State
2008 – Kansas beat Memphis
2015 – Duke beat Wisconsin
2017 – North Carolina beat Gonzaga
2021 – Baylor beat Gonzaga

Since 1985 there have been 18 instances of one No. 1 seed reaching the Championship Game (No. 1 seeds are 13–5 against other seeds in the title game) and 8 instances where no No. 1 seed made it to the title game.

Additional No. 1 seed stats 
In 1997, Arizona achieved a record when it became the only team to beat three No. 1 seeds in a single tournament. Arizona (No. 4 seed) beat Kansas in its own Southeast region, then beat North Carolina in the Final Four and finally Kentucky in the Championship game. The most No. 1 seeds any team can face in the tournament is three (provided that the team itself is not a No. 1 seed, in which case it can only face two No. 1 seeds in the tournament).
In 2011, the highest seed to advance to the Final Four was No. 3 seed Connecticut, making the 2011 tournament the only time that neither a No. 1 seed nor a No. 2 seed advanced into the final weekend of play. In the same tournament, Butler made history as the first program to make consecutive Final Fours while not being seeded No. 1 or No. 2 in either season.
There have been 16 teams that have entered the tournament unbeaten. Four of those teams were from UCLA, and all those Bruin teams won each of those tournaments. However, of the other 12 teams entering the tournament unbeaten, just three went on to win the tournament. For details, see table below.
In 1980, 1981, and 1982, when the tournament was 48 teams, DePaul was seeded No. 1 but was defeated in the first round.
Theoretically, a No. 1 seed's most difficult six-game path to win the tournament is to defeat a No. 16, a No. 8, a No. 4, a No. 2, a No. 1, and a No. 1 – the highest possible opposing seeds in successive rounds. No No. 1 seed has ever won all six such games, though two teams have won the first five.
In the 2002 tournament, Maryland reached the final after defeating teams seeded 16/8/4/2/1; they won the tournament after defeating No. 5 Indiana in the final.
In the 2015 tournament, Wisconsin reached the final after defeating teams seeded 16/8/4/2/1. In the final, they faced No. 1 Duke with a chance to complete the full six-game path. However, Wisconsin lost the final.

Teams No. 1 in national polls 
The following teams entered the tournament ranked No. 1 in at least one of the AP, UPI, or USA Today polls and won the tournament:

Performance of undefeated teams
The team's record here refers to their record before the first game of the NCAA tournament.

Undefeated teams not in the tournament
The NCAA tournament has undergone dramatic expansion since 1975, and since the tournament was expanded to 48 teams in 1980, no unbeaten teams have failed to qualify. As, by definition, a team would have to win its conference tournament, and thus secure an automatic bid to the tournament, to be undefeated in a season, the only way a team could finish undefeated and not reach the tournament is if the team is banned from postseason play. As of 2021, no team banned from postseason play has finished undefeated since 1980. Other possibilities for an undefeated team to fail to qualify: the team is independent; the conference does not yet have an automatic bid; or the team is transitioning from a lower NCAA division or the NAIA, during which time it is barred from NCAA-sponsored postseason play (currently, the NCAA tournament or NIT). No men's team from a transitional D-I member has been unbeaten after its conference tournament, but one such women's team has been—California Baptist in 2021. (CBU was able to play in the women's NIT, which has never been operated by the NCAA.)

Before 1980, there were occasions on which a team achieved perfection in the regular season, yet did not appear in the NCAA tournament.
During 1939, Long Island University finished the regular season 20–0 but decided to accept instead an invitation to the second NIT (which they won) instead of the first and only NABC tournament (later called the NCAA tournament), as the NIT was more prestigious at the time. It wasn't until the mid-1950s that the NCAA required that its tournament would have "first choice" in determining teams for their field. Before then, many of the more successful teams during the regular season chose to play in the NIT instead of the NCAA tournament. 
During 1940, Seton Hall finished the regular season 19–0, but their record had been built largely against weak teams and thus did not earn them an invitation to the postseason tournament.
During 1941, Milwaukee State finished the regular season 16–0, but their record had been built largely against weak teams and thus did not earn them an invitation to the postseason tournament.
During 1944, Army finished the regular season 15–0 but owing to World War II, the Cadets did not accept an invitation to postseason play.
During 1954, Kentucky finished 25–0 and were invited to the tournament, but declined the invitation, due their star players being ineligible due to already graduating.
During 1973, NC State finished the regular season 27–0 and ranked #2 (behind undefeated and eventual tournament champion UCLA) but were barred from participating in the NCAA tournament while on probation for recruiting violations.
During 1979, Alcorn State finished the regular season 27–0, but did not receive an invitation to the NCAA tournament. The Braves accepted a bid to the NIT, where they lost in the second round to eventual NIT champion Indiana.

Champions absent the next year
There have been nine times in which the tournament did not include the reigning champion (the previous year's winner):
1978 champion Kentucky went 19–12 in 1979. The Wildcats accepted an invitation to the National Invitation Tournament, losing their first-round game 68–67 in overtime to Clemson.
Both 1979 champion Michigan State (12–15) and 1979 runner up Indiana State (16–11) failed to qualify for the 1980 NCAA Tournament. Furthermore, neither was invited to the National Invitation Tournament, and Michigan State is the only team to finish the subsequent season with a losing record. Following the 1979 NCAA tournament, Indiana State lost Larry Bird to graduation, and Magic Johnson left Michigan State after his sophomore season to enter the NBA draft.
1983 champion North Carolina State went 19–13 in 1984. The Wolfpack accepted an invitation to the National Invitation Tournament, losing their first-round game 74–71 to Florida State in Reynolds Coliseum.
1986 champion Louisville went 18–14 in 1987. The team declined an invitation to the postseason National Invitation Tournament.
1988 champion Kansas went 19–12 in 1989. However, the team was ineligible for participation in the 1989 NCAA Tournament due to NCAA sanctions for recruiting violations.
2007 champion Florida and 2007 runner-up Ohio State both failed to qualify for the NCAA tournament in 2008. Both accepted invitations to that year's postseason National Invitation Tournament, and both made it to the semifinals. Florida fell to Massachusetts in the semifinals, and Ohio State beat UMass in the NIT Championship Game to win the tournament.
2009 champion North Carolina went 20–17 in 2010. The Tar Heels accepted an invitation to the National Invitation Tournament, and reached the finals, losing to Dayton.
2012 champion Kentucky went 21–11 in 2013 and failed to make that tournament. The Wildcats were invited to the National Invitation Tournament, where they lost to Robert Morris in the first round of the tournament.
2014 champion UConn went 20–14 in 2015 and failed to make that tournament. The Huskies were invited to the National Invitation Tournament and lost to Arizona State in the first round.

Coaches

Most national championships
10 National Championships
John Wooden (1964, 1965, 1967, 1968, 1969, 1970, 1971, 1972, 1973, 1975)

5 National Championships
Mike Krzyzewski (1991, 1992, 2001, 2010, 2015)

4 National Championships
Adolph Rupp (1948, 1949, 1951, 1958)

3 National Championships
Jim Calhoun (1999, 2004, 2011)
Bob Knight (1976, 1981, 1987)
Roy Williams (2005, 2009, 2017)

2 National Championships
Denny Crum (1980, 1986)
Billy Donovan (2006, 2007)
Henry Iba (1945, 1946)
Ed Jucker (1961, 1962)
Branch McCracken (1940, 1953)
Bill Self (2008, 2022)
Dean Smith (1982, 1993)
Phil Woolpert (1955, 1956)
Jay Wright (2016, 2018)

1 National Championship

Phog Allen (1952)
Tony Bennett (2019)
Jim Boeheim (2003)
Larry Brown (1988)
John Calipari (2012)
Everett Dean (1942)
Scott Drew (2021)
Steve Fisher (1989)
Bud Foster (1941)
Joe B. Hall (1978)
Jim Harrick (1995)
Don Haskins (1966)
Jud Heathcote (1979)
Howard Hobson (1939)
Nat Holman (1950)
George Ireland (1963)
Tom Izzo (2000)
Doggie Julian (1947)
Ken Loeffler (1954)
Rollie Massimino (1985)
Al McGuire (1977)
Frank McGuire (1957)
Pete Newell (1959)
Kevin Ollie (2014)
Lute Olson (1997)
Vadal Peterson (1944)
Rick Pitino (1996)
Nolan Richardson (1994)
Everett Shelton (1943)
Norm Sloan (1974)
Tubby Smith (1998)
Jerry Tarkanian (1990)
Fred Taylor (1960)
John Thompson (1984)
Jim Valvano (1983)
Gary Williams (2002)

National championships among active coaches
 2 Bill Self (2008, 2022)
 1 Tony Bennett (2019)
 1 John Calipari (2012)
 1 Scott Drew (2021)
 1 Tom Izzo (2000)
 1 Rick Pitino (1996)

Schools winning a national championship under multiple coaches
Five coaches
Kentucky: Adolph Rupp, Joe B. Hall, Rick Pitino, Tubby Smith, and John Calipari
Three coaches
Kansas: Phog Allen, Larry Brown, and Bill Self
North Carolina: Frank McGuire, Dean Smith, and Roy Williams
Two coaches
UConn: Jim Calhoun and Kevin Ollie
Indiana: Branch McCracken and Bob Knight
Michigan State: Jud Heathcote and Tom Izzo
North Carolina State: Norm Sloan and Jim Valvano
UCLA: John Wooden and Jim Harrick
Villanova: Rollie Massimino and Jay Wright

Most teams from different schools taken to the Final Four
Rick Pitino is the only coach to have officially taken three teams to the Final Four: Providence (1987), Kentucky (1993, 1996, 1997) and Louisville (2005, 2012).

There are 13 coaches who have officially coached two schools to the Final Four – Roy Williams, Eddie Sutton, Frank McGuire, Lon Kruger, Hugh Durham, Jack Gardner, Lute Olson, Gene Bartow, Forddy Anderson, Lee Rose, Bob Huggins, Lou Henson, and Kelvin Sampson.

Larry Brown took UCLA to the Final Four in 1980, but it was vacated due to NCAA violations. He also took Kansas in 1986 and 1988.

Point differentials
Point differentials, or margin of victory, can be viewed either by the championship game, or by a team's performance over the whole tournament.

Championship victory margins
Largest margin of victory in a championship game
30 points, by UNLV in 1990 (103–73, over Duke)

Smallest margin of victory in a championship game
1 point, on six occasions
Indiana 69, Kansas 68 (1953)
North Carolina 54, Kansas 53/3OT (1957)
California 71, West Virginia 70 (1959)
North Carolina 63, Georgetown 62 (1982)
Indiana 74, Syracuse 73 (1987)
Michigan 80, Seton Hall 79/OT (1989)

Championship games that went to overtime
Eight times the championship game has been tied at the end of regulation. On one of those occasions (1957) the game went into double and then triple overtime.
North Carolina 54, Kansas 53/3OT (1957)
Utah 42, Dartmouth 40 (1944)
Cincinnati 70, Ohio St. 65 (1961)
Loyola 60, Cincinnati 58 (1963)
Michigan 80, Seton Hall 79 (1989)
Arizona 84, Kentucky 79 (1997)
Kansas 75, Memphis 68 (2008)
Virginia 85, Texas Tech 77 (2019)

Accumulated victory margins
Largest point differential accumulated over the entire tournament by championship teams
Teams that played 6 games
+129 Kentucky 1996
+124 Villanova 2016
+121 North Carolina 2009
+112 UNLV 1990
+106 Villanova 2018

Teams that played 5 games
+115 Loyola Chicago 1963
+113 Indiana 1981
+104 Michigan State 1979
+69 San Francisco 1955
+66 Indiana 1976

Teams that played 4 games
+95 UCLA 1967
+85 UCLA 1968
+78 Ohio State 1960
+76 UCLA 1969
+72 UCLA 1970
+72 UCLA 1972

Teams that played 3 games
+56 Oklahoma A&M 1945
+52 Kentucky 1949
+51 Indiana 1940
+47 Kentucky 1948
+46 Oregon 1939
Teams winning the championship and obtaining a margin of 10 points in every game of the tournament
Achieved 13 times by 10 schools
Oregon (1939)
Kentucky (1949)
San Francisco (1956)
Ohio State (1960)
UCLA (1967, 1970 and 1973)
Michigan State (1979 and 2000)
Indiana (1981)
Duke (2001)
North Carolina (2009)
Villanova (2018)

Seed pairing results

Since the inception of the 64-team tournament in 1985, each seed-pairing has played 152 games in the Round of 64, with the following results:

Round of 64 results
 The No. 1 seed is 150–2 against the No. 16 seed
 The No. 2 seed is 141–11 against the No. 15 seed
 The No. 3 seed is 130–22 against the No. 14 seed
 The No. 4 seed is 120–32 against the No. 13 seed
 The No. 5 seed is 99–53 against the No. 12 seed
 The No. 6 seed is 94–58 against the No. 11 seed
 The No. 7 seed is 93–59 against the No. 10 seed
 The No. 8 seed is 74–78 against the No. 9 seed

Round of 32 results
 In the 1/16 vs. 8/9 bracket:

 In the 2/15 vs. 7/10 bracket:

 In the 3/14 vs. 6/11 bracket:

 In the 4/13 vs. 5/12 bracket:

Round of 16 results
 In the 1/8/9/16 vs. 4/5/12/13 bracket:

 In the 2/7/10/15 vs. 3/6/11/14 bracket:

Regional finals results

Host cities
This table lists all the cities that have hosted or will host the Final Four, as well as the venues in which the Final Four was or will be played. For additional information about a particular year's tournament, click on the year to go directly to that year's NCAA men's basketball tournament or go to the main article.

Popular culture
The NCAA tournament and the Super Bowl are the two American sports events that draw both fans and non-fans. Many people are connected to a school in the tournament, having been an alumni of one of the participants, knowing someone from the college, or living close to the school.

Bracketology and pools

There are pools or private gambling-related contests as to who can predict the tournament most correctly. The filling out of a tournament bracket has been referred to as a "national pastime." Its popularity grew around 1985, when the tournament expanded to 64 games, forming four symmetrical regions with 15 games apiece to decide the Final Four. Filling out a tournament bracket with predictions is called the practice of "bracketology" and sports programming during the tournament is rife with commentators comparing the accuracy of their predictions. On The Dan Patrick Show, a wide variety of celebrities from various fields (such as Darius Rucker, Charlie Sheen, Neil Patrick Harris, Ellen DeGeneres, Dave Grohl, and Brooklyn Decker) have posted full brackets with predictions. Former U.S. president Barack Obama began releasing his bracket annually in 2009, his first year in office. While in office, he filled out the men's and women's brackets on ESPN with reporter Andy Katz, and they were also posted on the White House website. He continued releasing his picks after leaving office.

There are many tournament prediction scoring systems. Most award points for correctly picking the winning team in a particular match up, with increasingly more points being given for correctly predicting later round winners. Some provide bonus points for correctly predicting upsets, the amount of the bonus varying based on the degree of upset. Some just provide points for wins by correctly picked teams in the brackets.

There are 2^63 or 9.2 quintillion possibilities for the possible winners in a 64-team NCAA bracket, making the odds of randomly picking a perfect bracket (i.e. without weighting for seed number) 9.2 quintillion to 1. With the expansion of the tournament field to 68 teams in 2011, there are now 2^67 or 147.57 quintillion possibilities if one includes the First Four opening round games.

There are numerous awards and prizes given by companies for anyone who can make the perfect bracket. One of the largest was done by a partnership between Quicken Loans and Berkshire Hathaway, which was backed by Warren Buffett, with a $1 billion prize to any person(s) who could correctly predict the outcome of the 2014 tournament. No one was able to complete the challenge and win the $1 billion prize.

Workplace productivity
During the tournament, American workers take extended lunch breaks at sports bars to follow the game. They also use company computer and internet access to view games, scores, and bracket results. Some workplaces block access to sports and entertainment sites, but the rise of mobile devices and live-streamed games bypassed those restrictions, and even workers not normally in front of computers then had access. Workers spend an estimated average of six hours on the tournament each year, and U.S. employers are projected to lose around $13 billion due to lost productivity during the tournament.

Tournament associated terms
As indicated below, none of these phrases are exclusively used in regard to the NCAA tournament. Nonetheless, they are associated widely with the tournament, sometimes for legal reasons, sometimes as part of the American sports vernacular.

March Madness
March Madness is a popular term for season-ending basketball tournaments played in March. March Madness is also a registered trademark currently owned exclusively by the NCAA.

H. V. Porter, an official with the Illinois High School Association (and later a member of the Basketball Hall of Fame), was the first person to use March Madness to describe a basketball tournament. Porter published an essay named March Madness during 1939, and during 1942, he used the phrase in a poem, Basketball Ides of March. Through the years the use of March Madness increased, especially in Illinois, Indiana, and other parts of the Midwest. During this period the term was used almost exclusively in reference to state high school tournaments. During 1977, Jim Enright published a book about the Illinois tournament entitled March Madness.

Fans began associating the term with the NCAA tournament during the early 1980s. Evidence suggests that CBS sportscaster Brent Musburger, who had worked for many years in Chicago before joining CBS, popularized the term during the annual tournament broadcasts. The NCAA has credited Bob Walsh of the Seattle Organizing Committee for starting the March Madness celebration in 1984.

Only during the 1990s did either the IHSA or the NCAA think about trademarking the term, and by that time a small television production company named Intersport had already trademarked it. IHSA eventually bought the trademark rights from Intersport, and then went to court to establish its primacy. IHSA sued GTE Vantage, an NCAA licensee that used the name March Madness for a computer game based on the college tournament. During 1996, in a historic ruling, Illinois High School Association v. GTE Vantage, Inc., the United States Court of Appeals for the Seventh Circuit created the concept of a "dual-use trademark", granting both the IHSA and NCAA the right to trademark the term for their own purposes.

After the ruling, the NCAA and IHSA joined forces and created the March Madness Athletic Association to coordinate the licensing of the trademark and investigate possible trademark infringement. One such case involved a company that had obtained the internet domain name marchmadness.com and was using it to post information about the NCAA tournament. During 2003, by March Madness Athletic Association v. Netfire, Inc., the United States Court of Appeals for the Fifth Circuit decided that March Madness was not a generic term, and ordered Netfire to relinquish the domain name to the NCAA.

Later during the 2000s, the IHSA relinquished its ownership share in the trademark, although it retained the right to use the term in association with high school championships. During October 2010, the NCAA reached a settlement with Intersport, paying $17.2 million for the latter company's license to use the trademark.

Sweet Sixteen
This is a popular term for the regional semifinal round of the tournament, consisting of the final 16 teams. As in the case of "March Madness", this was first used by a high school federation—in this case, the Kentucky High School Athletic Association (KHSAA), which has used the term for decades to describe its own season-ending tournaments. It officially registered the trademark in 1988. Unlike the situation with "March Madness", the KHSAA has retained sole ownership of the "Sweet Sixteen" trademark; it licenses the term to the NCAA for use in collegiate tournaments.

Elite Eight
The Elite Eight is a popular term to describe the two teams in each of the four regional championship games. The NCAA officially uses the term for the eight-team final phase of the Division II men's and women's basketball tournaments. The winners of these games in the D-I tournament advance to the Final Four (the NCAA does not use the term "Final Four" in D-II). The NCAA trademarked this phrase in 1997. Like "March Madness," the phrase "Elite Eight" originally referred to the Illinois High School Boys Basketball Championship, the single-elimination high school basketball tournament run by the Illinois High School Association. In 1956, when the IHSA finals were reduced from sixteen to eight teams, a new nickname for Sweet Sixteen was needed, and Elite Eight won the vote. The IHSA trademarked the term in 1995; the trademark rights are now held by the March Madness Athletic Association, a joint venture between the NCAA and IHSA formed after a 1996 court case allowed both organizations to use "March Madness" for their own tournaments.

Final Four
The term Final Four refers to the last four teams remaining in the playoff tournament. These are the champions of the tournament's four regional brackets, and are the only teams remaining on the tournament's final weekend. (While the term "Final Four" was not used during the early decades of the tournament, the term has been applied retroactively to include the last four teams in tournaments from earlier years, even when only two brackets existed.)

Some claim that the phrase Final Four was first used to describe the final games of Indiana's annual high school basketball tournament. But the NCAA, which has a trademark on the term, says Final Four was originated by a Plain Dealer sportswriter, Ed Chay, in a 1975 article that appeared in the Official Collegiate Basketball Guide. The article stated that Marquette University "was one of the final four" of the 1974 tournament. The NCAA started capitalizing the term during 1978 and converting it to a trademark several years later.

During recent years, the term Final Four has been used for other sports besides basketball. Tournaments which use Final Four include the EuroLeague in basketball, national basketball competitions in several European countries, and the now-defunct European Hockey League. Together with the name Final Four, these tournaments have adopted an NCAA-style format in which the four surviving teams compete in a single-elimination tournament held in one place, typically, during one weekend. The derivative term "Frozen Four" is used by the NCAA to refer to the final rounds of the Division I men's and women's ice hockey tournaments. Until 1999, it was just a popular nickname for the last two rounds of the hockey tournament; officially, it was also known as the Final Four.

Cinderella team
A Cinderella team, both in NCAA basketball and other sports, is one that achieves far greater success than would reasonably have been best expected. In the NCAA tournament, teams may earn the Cinderella title after multiple wins in a single tournament against higher seeded teams. The term first came into widespread usage in 1950, when the City College of New York unexpectedly won the tournament in the same month that a film adaptation of Cinderella was released in the United States.

Notable Cinderella teams include North Carolina State in 1983 (the subject of a 30 for 30 documentary titled Survive and Advance), Villanova in 1985 (the lowest-seeded team to ever win the tournament), LSU in 1986 (the only team to defeat the top three seeds in their region in the same tournament), UMBC in 2018 (the first No. 16 seed to defeat a No. 1 seed), and Saint Peter's in 2022 (the first No. 15 seed to advance to the Elite Eight).

Notes

See also
 NCAA Division I women's basketball tournament
 NCAA Division II men's basketball tournament
 NCAA Division III men's basketball tournament

References

External links

 
 News coverage at CBS Sports, ESPN, Fox Sports, NBC Sports, Sporting News, Sports Illustrated
 Odds of a perfect bracket 1 in 9.2 quintillion
 Awards history through 2020-2021 (Archived)
 Coaching records through 2020-2021 (Archived)
 Attendance records through 2020-2021 (Archived)

 
Recurring sporting events established in 1939
College men's basketball competitions in the United States
Postseason college basketball competitions in the United States